"Te Quedaste" is a Latin pop song recorded by American duo Ha*Ash. It was first included on Ha*Ash's first studio album Ha*Ash (2003) where it was released as the third single and then included on their live album deluxe Primera Fila: Hecho Realidad (2015).

Background and release 
"Te Quedaste" was written by Leonel García and Áureo Baqueiro. It serves as the three track to her first studio album Ha*Ash (2003), and then recorded live for his live album deluxe Primera Fila: Hecho Realidad in 2015.

Commercial performance 
The track peaked at number 28 in the Latin Pop Songs, number 17 in the Hot Latin songs and at number 17 in the Latin Airplay charts in the United States. In Mexico,  the song peaked at number 4 in the Monitor Latino.

Music video 
A music video for "Te Quedaste" was released on February 1, 2014. Was published on her YouTube channel on October 25, 2009. , the video has over 38 million views on YouTube.

Credits and personnel 
Credits adapted from AllMusic and Genius.

Recording and management

 Recording Country: México
 Sony / ATV Discos Music Publishing LLC / Westwood Publishing
 (P) 2003 Sony Music Entertainment México, S.A. De C.V. (studio version)
 (P) 2015 Sony Music Entertainment México, S.A. De C.V. (live version)

Ha*Ash
 Ashley Grace  – vocals, guitar (studio version / live version)
 Hanna Nicole  – vocals, guitar (studio version / live version)
Additional personnel
 Áureo Baqueiro  – songwriting, recording engineer, arranger, director (studio version)
 Leonel García  – songwriting (studio version) / live version)
 Armando Ávila  – guitar, acoustic guitar, recording engineer (studio version)
 Rodolfo Cruz  – recording engineer (studio version)
 Arranger Mateo Aguilar  – arranger (live version)
 Fernando Ruíz Velasco  – arranger (live version)
 Rodrigo Duarte  – arranger (live version)
 Edy Vega  – arranger (live version)
 Lary Ruíz Velasco  – arranger (live version)
 Áureo Baqueiro  – songwriting (live version)
 Gerardo Morgadoo  – engineer (live version)
 Alfonso Palacios  – engineer (live version)
 Joel Alonso  – engineer (live version)
 Jules Ramllano  – director, engineer (live version)

Charts

Release history

References 

Ha*Ash songs
2003 songs
2003 singles
Songs written by Áureo Baqueiro
Songs written by Leonel García
Song recordings produced by Áureo Baqueiro
Spanish-language songs
Pop ballads
Sony Music Latin singles
2000s ballads